Cryptomyelois is a genus of snout moths. It was described by Roesler and Küppers, in 1979, and is known from Sumatra.

Species
 Cryptomyelois glaucobasis
 Cryptomyelois irmhilda Roesler & Küppers, 1979

References

Phycitini
Pyralidae genera